Master of Confusion is Gamma Ray's third EP, released on 15 March 2013. The EP contains 10 songs split into 3 sides, with the A Side containing two new studio tracks, the B Side containing 2 studio covers and the C Side containing six live songs from the April 28, 2011, Bochum gig. "Empire of the Undead" and "Master of Confusion" are set to take part on the new Gamma Ray album, Empire of the Undead.

Track listing

Personnel
 Gamma Ray
 Kai Hansen – Lead vocals (all but 9), rhythm guitar
 Henjo Richter – Lead guitar, backing vocals, keyboards
 Dirk Schlächter – Bass, backing vocals
 Michael Ehré – Drums (1-4)
 Additional and guest musicians
 Dan Zimmermann - Drums (5-10)
 Michael Kiske – Lead vocals (9)

Gamma Ray (band) albums
Heavy metal EPs